Montazur Rahman Akbar is a Bangladeshi film director, screenwriter, producer, social activist and entrepreneur. He is known for his work in the Bengali-language film industry, which is centered in Dhaka, Bangladesh. Akbar also fought in the 1971 Bangladesh Liberation War.

After directing multiple plays, Akbar worked as an assistant director on the films Chhutir Ghonta and Janata Express under directors Matin Rahman and Azizur Rahman, respectively. He worked as an assistant director from 1979 to 1990.

Akbar became a director in 1991. He has worked with actor Manna on 22 films, writer Abdullah Zahir Babu on 46 films, actor Dipjol on 19 films and editor Amzad Hossain on 24 films. Akbar has written screenplays for some of his films. He founded the production companies Nayan-Apon Production and Star Plus, and he is co-founder of Panorama Movies. Akbar's films introduced various actors, including Dipjol, Popy, Keya, Riya Sen, Shakiba, Songita, Antara Biswas and Puspi, to Dhallywood. Akbar served as an executive board member of the Bangladesh Film Producers and Distributors Association and the Bangladesh Film Directors Association. He founded a development NGO, Prochesta, and a theater organization, Drama Circle. He has also directed television commercials and serial dramas. Akbar has appeared as guest judge for multiple television programs. He also runs several business enterprises.

Personal life

Family
Akbar's parents were Kabir Uddin Mondol and Rupjan Bibi. His father was a businessman and two-time elected union council member for the Awami League division in Joypurhat District. His mother was a housewife. Akbar has three sisters and three brothers. One of his brothers, Istofa Rahman, was a cinematographer.

Akbar married Mariam Rahman on 13 March 1978, and they have three sons. Akbar's oldest son, Apu Monwar, is a news editor for Ekattor Television.

Military career
Akbar fought in the Bangladesh Liberation War in 1971. He served Sector 7 under Sector Commander Quazi Nuruzzaman and Group Commander Saidur Rahman. Akbar trained at Panikhoni in Siliguri, India.

Education
Akbar attended Akkelpur FU Pilot High School in 1973 and Akkelpur MR Degree College in 1975. He received a Bachelor of Arts degree from Joypurhat Government College in 1977. While in college, he worked in his father's fish business and distributed fish across northern Bangladesh.  He was also an active member of Bangladesh Chatro Union at that time.

Philanthropy
Akbar is the executive director of a non-governmental organization (NGO), Prochesta. He founded Prochesta in 2000 in his hometown, Joypurhat. Prochesta works with various partner organizations to improve sanitation, drinking water supply, and infrastructure in Joypurhat and nearby districts. Prochesta also spreads information about basic hygiene practices such as hand washing.

Career

19701989
During the 1970s, Akbar participated in his local theater group, Chantara Club, and his college theater group, Akkelpur MR College Club. Between 1973 and 1978, he directed many stage dramas, including Pagla Garod, Sidur Niyona Muche, Ek Mutho Vat, Dayie Ke, Malar Prem and Nowab Siraj Ud Dowla. Akbar was an active member of the Bangladesh Chatro Union in the 1970s. He was also worked for his father's fish wholesale business at that time. In the 1980s, Akbar worked as assistant director under Azizur Rahman on several films, including Chhutir Ghonta, Janata, Express, Mayer Achol, Mehman, Mohanogor, Jontor Montor and Sonar Tori. He also worked for Matin Rahman on various films, including Lal Kajol, Jibon Dhara, Radha Kishna and Birangona Sokhina. He worked with Zillur Rahman on Tokdirer Khela, Miss Lolita, Achol Bondi, and Sukh Tara. In 1989, Akbar was a special correspondent for Weekly Nipoon, a weekly entertainment magazine published in Dhaka.

19902000
Akbar's worked as a director for the film Nyay Juddho in 1991. In 1992, Ilias Kanchon and Diti acted in Akbar's film Chakor. Akbar's first job as a director was for the film Takar Pahar, which had a delayed debut in 1993. Takar Pahar was produced by Anwar Hossain Afjal, the older brother of Dipjol.  Also in 1993, he directed Prem Dewana, produced by A. K. M. Jahangir Khan under his banner Alamgir Pictures. He also directed Disco Dancer and Babar Adesh for Alamgir Pictures. In 1996, Akbar directed the films Baghini Konna, Khalnayok, Bashira and Shoitan Manush. In 1997, he directed Coolie. The film grossed 70 million Bangladeshi taka ($1.7M as of 1997) with a budget of 12 million, making it the highest-grossing Bangladeshi film of 1997. The actress Sadika Parvin Popy made her debut in Coolie. Later in 1996, Akbar cast Mousumi for the romantic film Andha Bhalobasha and the Alamgir Pictures film Amar Maa. In 1998, Akbar directed Shanto Keno Mastan, starring Manna. The film grossed 50 million against a budget of 9 million. Akbar also directed 5 films for Arman Production. Akbar directed the Indo-Bangla joint venture film Moner Moto Mon, it didn't do well commercially. Moner Moto Mon was Akbar's third collaboration with Bony Pictures, after his earlier work as an assistant director on the Bony Picture films Miss Lolita and Radha Kishno. In 1999, he was the advisor director for Helal Khan's film Asha Amar Asha. That same year, Akbar directed the films Ke Amar Baba, Bhoyongkor Bishu, Moger Mulluk and Lathi.

20002009
In 2000, Akbar and Monjurul Hassan co-founded the production company Panorama Movies. Akbar produced and directed Kukkhato Khuni for Panorama Movies. Arman Production's second film was Gunda Number One. His next film was Mone Pore Tomake, which introduced Riya Sen to mainstream cinema. In 2001, Akbar established a distributorship of the electronics brand Walton in Joypurhat under Apu Electronics Bazar (20012014). Rituparna Sen Gupta and Ilias Kanchon were cast in Chairman, another film directed by Akbar. Arman Production's third film, Kothing Bastob, which introduced Keya, was directed by Akbar. He also directed Rongbaz Badsha and Bhoungkor Sonstrasi, the latter of which was banned by censors. In 2002, he produced and directed Bhayanok Songghorso and an Arman Production film Major Saheb. He also directed a Dipjol film, Dhakaiya Mastan. Akbar directed three further films that year: Arman, Mastaner Upor Mastan and Aghat Palta Aghat. In 2003, he produced and directed Bachao, Top Somrat and the Dipjol film Kothin Shimar. He directed Bouer Somman, produced by Mousumi. Akbar also wrote songs for the film Big Boss. In 2004, Akbar directed Bostir Rani Suriya, with lead actors Sadika Parveen Popy, Shakib Khan and Dipjol. In 2005, he directed Bhoyonkor Raja and Action Lady. In 2006, Akbar founded Nayan-Apon Production. He made the films System, which came out in 2006, and Nishidhdho Prem, released in 2007 and produced by his wife Mariam Rahman. Akbar also directed Dushman Khotom in 2006 and Kukkhato Nuru in 2007. In 2008, Akbar founded StarPlus, where he produced and directed Babar Jonno Joddho. In 2009, he directed Kajer Manush, directed by Dipjol. Kajer Manush was a hit at the box office, and it won the Janatar Niswas Personality Award. Akbar later directed Tumi Amar Swami in 2009. He was also a guest judge on television reality programs Super Hero Super Heroin (NTV).

20102020
In 2010, Akbar directed and produced Top Hero with Shakib Khan. He and Dipjol cast Mayer Chokh and Rikshawalar Chele for his next films, Evabey Bhalobasha Hoy. The film used songs by singer S.D. Rubel. The film was successful at the box office. In 2011, Akbar directed the Dipjol films Chotto Songsar and Bajarer Coolie. That same year, he was a guest judge on Mirakkel Akkel Challenger (2011) on the channel Zee Bangla. In 2013, Akbar directed the Jaaz Multimedia film Tobuo Bhalobashi. Akbar switched to television and directed his first TV drama, Pakhal, which aired in 2013. He directed package dramas Golden Swarna, Bracelate and Kuasha. He also directed the drama serials Kaji Saheber Tin Putro and Pakhi Ebong Mnushera. He directed television commercials and documentaries such as Agency Greenland Training Center, Decent Holding and Hiton TV. In 2013, he was a guest judge on Voice of the Nation which premiered on Ekushey Television. In 2014, Akbar produced and directed the low-budget films Age Jodi Jantam Tui Hobi Por and My Name Is Simi. After the success of the Walton showroom, he took distribution of Pran under the trading corporation Mariam Traders later that year. In 2015, he produced and directed Bojhena Se Bojhena, which was neither very successful nor very unsuccessful at the box office. He also set up the furniture brand Furniture Village. In 2016, Akbar returned to the mainstream media with the film Nawab Siraj-Ud-Dowla, produced by United Club in Jamalgonj Theatre in Jamalgonj, Joypurhat. In 2017, he directed Dulavai Zindabad which yielded average box office returns. He also established a fashion house called Cholte Cholte, which lasted from 2016 to 2017. In 2018, Akbar founded the theater group Drama Circle in Joypurhat, Bangladesh. His first film under the group was Swadhinota Amar Maa. He also directed multiple short films, including Obohela, Riksawalar Shopno, Mobile Recharge, Ekti Premer Mrittu, Ekjon Medhabi Chatrir Mrittu and Dance Teacher. He also directed 53 episodes of the soap opera Ekdin Protidin.

2021–present 
 he is producing the films My Darling, Ayna, Kajer Chele, Manush Keno Omanush, Banglar Hercules, Jemon Jamay Temon Bow, Ghor Vanga Songsar. Kazi Shaheber Tin Putro premiered in YouTube.

Works

As theater director

As television director

As producer, director, writer

As web series director

As assistant director

As television commercial director

Awards and honours

References

External links
 
 Montazur Rahman Akbar on Bangla Movie Database (in Bangla)
 Montazur Rahman Akbar on Facebook

Living people
People from Joypurhat District
Bangladeshi film directors
Bangladeshi theatre directors
Bangladeshi film producers
Year of birth missing (living people)